Urera kaalae, opuhe, is a species of flowering plant in the nettle family, Urticaceae, that is endemic to the island of Oahu in Hawaii. Currently it is restricted to the southern and central parts of the Waianae Mountains. Associated plants include maile (Alyxia oliviformis), hame (Antidesma platyphyllum), Asplenium kaulfusii, Athyrium spp., āwikiwiki (Canavalia spp.), pāpala (Charpentiera spp.), akoko (Euphorbia spp.), poolā (Claoxylon sandwicense), ēlama (Diospyros hillebrandii), Doryopteris spp., iei.e. (Freycinetia arborea), manono (Hedyotis acuminata), Hibiscus spp., olopua (Nestegis sandwicensis), māmaki (Pipturus albidus), hala pepe (Dracaena spp.), ālaa (Pouteria sandwicensis), kōpiko (Psychotria spp.), heuhiuhi (Senna gaudichaudii), aiai (Streblus pendulinus), ōpuhe (Urera glabra), and maua (Xylosma hawaiensis). It is threatened by habitat loss.

References

kaalae
Endemic flora of Hawaii
Critically endangered plants
Taxonomy articles created by Polbot